The 2021 Christy Ring Cup was the 17th staging of the Christy Ring Cup since its establishment by the Gaelic Athletic Association in 2005. The cup began on 26 June 2021 and ended on 1 August 2021.

Covid-19 caused all London games to be postponed for an extra year. 

The final was played on 1 August 2021 at Croke Park in Dublin, between Offaly and Derry, in what was their first ever meeting in a final. Offaly won the match by 0-41 to 2-14 to claim their first ever cup title.

Offaly's Eoghan Cahill was the Ring Cup's top scorer with 0-36.

Team changes

To Championship 
Relegated from the Joe McDonagh Cup

 None

Promoted from the Nicky Rackard Cup

 None

From Championship 
Promoted to the Joe McDonagh Cup

 Down
 Kildare

Relegated to the Nicky Rackard Cup

 None

Competition Format

Cup format 

The format has been changed for 2021 with 5 teams playing across two groups, one with 3 teams and one with 2 teams based on an open draw.

Group A will feature 3 teams and be played in a single Round Robin format with each team having one home game and one away game.

Group B will feature 2 teams who will play a single fixture.

All teams will play a knockout format after this group stage, with the group winners and second-placed team in Group A being placed in the semi-finals. A tie between the third-placed team in Group A and second-placed team in Group B will determine the fourth semi-finalist.

Promotion 
The winner of the final will be promoted to the Joe McDonagh Cup.

Relegation 
The loser of the quarter-final will be relegated to the Nicky Rackard Cup

Group stage

Group A 

{| class="wikitable" style="text-align:center"
!width=20|
!width=150 style="text-align:left;"|Team
!width=20|
!width=20|
!width=20|
!width=20|
!width=50|
!width=50|
!width=20|
!width=20|
!Qualification
|- style="background:#ccffcc"
|1|| align="left" | Derry||2||2||0||0||2-42||1-33||+12||4
| rowspan="2" |Advance to Semi-Finals
|- style="background:#ccffcc"
|2|| align="left" | Wicklow||2||1||0||1||2-36||3-34||-1||2
|- style="background:#FFFFE0"
|3|| align="left" | Roscommon||2||0||0||2||2-26||2-37||-11||0
|Advance to Quarter-Finals
|}

Group A round 1

Group A round 2

Group A round 3

Group B 

{| class="wikitable" style="text-align:center"
!width=20|
!width=150 style="text-align:left;"|Team
!width=20|
!width=20|
!width=20|
!width=20|
!width=50|
!width=50|
!width=20|
!width=20|
!Qualification
|- style="background:#ccffcc"
|1||align=left| Offaly||1||1||0||0||2-39||2-17||+22||2
|Advance to Semi-Finals
|- style="background:#FFFFE0"
|2|| align="left" | Sligo||1||0||0||1||2-17||2-39||-22||0
|Advance to Quarter-Finals
|}

Group B round 1

Knockout stage

Bracket

Quarter-final

Roscommon are relegated to the 2022 Nicky Rackard Cup.

Semi-finals

Final

Offaly are promoted to the 2022 Joe McDonagh Cup.

Statistics

Top scorers

Top Scorer Overall

In a single game

References 

Christy Ring Cup
Christy Ring Cup